Carex davidii is a tussock-forming species of perennial sedge in the family Cyperaceae. It is native to parts of  China.

The plant was first formally described by the botanist Adrien René Franchet in 1884 as a part of the work Plantae Davidianae ex Sinarum Imperio.

See also
List of Carex species

References

davidii
Taxa named by Adrien René Franchet
Plants described in 1884
Flora of China